Andrews is a town in Cherokee County, North Carolina, United States. The population was 1,781 at the 2010 census.

History

Cherokee era
Indigenous peoples lived in the area for thousands of years before European encounter. By the late 16th or 17th century, the Cherokee had a pronounced presence in the area.

White settlement and history

Andrews
The largest town within the township is Andrews. In the early 19th century, when most white settlers began arriving, the area was known as "Jamesville", after James Whitaker. An Indian trading post was established in 1837, just a short time before Cherokee removal.

Andrews was established like many other southern towns, through a land auction. The Richmond and Danville Railroad had stopped construction of the Murphy Branch just east of here. In the late 1880s, Col. A.B. Andrews, who was a second vice president for Richmond and Danville, was sent to the area to establish a commissary for workers in the Nantahala construction camps. Andrews bought  of land for the sum of $1,200. By spring 1890, Andrews was instructed to sell off the 50-acre tract at a land sale, which was held in September. The land was platted out, and about three quarters of the lots were sold at the initial sale. Some lots were donated for a schoolhouse and churches. The remaining lots were sold through private sales.

In 1905, the town was incorporated, with David Samuel Russell appointed as the first mayor of the new town. The Franklin Pierce Cover House, First Baptist Church, and Walker's Inn are listed on the National Register of Historic Places.

After African-Americans were forced out of Cumming, Georgia in 1912, some came to Andrews and started a community called Happytop.

Andrews was home to the Wilhide brothers, Robert M. and Wilfred W. Wilhide, born between 1920 and 1922. Both were born and raised in Andrews, attended flight school at Cherry Point, North Carolina, and enlisted in the U.S. Marine Corps as pilots during World War II. In the space of several days, after inflicting  severe losses upon the Japanese fleet, both brothers were lost and killed during missions near Okinawa. The Wilhide brothers were given a memorial in the Valleytown cemetery, and a monument at Veterans Memorial Park in Andrews, not far from their childhood home and birthplace.

Geography

U.S. Routes 19, 74, and U.S. Route 129 form a four-lane bypass around the northern edge of the town; the highways lead northeast  to Topton, where they diverge, and southwest  to Murphy, the county seat.

Valleytown Township dominates the eastern part of Cherokee County. The area is bordered by Graham County to the north, Clay County to the south, and Macon County to the east. Within the township are the towns of Marble in the west, Andrews at the center, and Topton in the far east at the Macon and Graham county lines.

Demographics

2020 census

As of the 2020 United States census, there were 1,667 people, 714 households, and 400 families residing in the town.

2010 census
In the 2010 census, the total population was 1,781 people residing in 780 households including 452 family units. The population density was 1,090 people per square mile.

2000 census
In the 2000 census, there were 831 housing units at an average density of 613.2 per square mile (235.9/km2). The racial makeup of the town was 93.76% White, 2.68% African American, 0.69% Native American, 1.06% from other races, and 1.81% from two or more races. Hispanic or Latino of any race were 2.62% of the population.

There were 703 households, of which 26.5% had children under the age of 18 living with them, 41.7% were married couples living together, 14.9% had a female householder with no husband present, and 39.7% were non-families. 36.7% of all households were made up of individuals, and 18.8% had someone living alone who was 65 years of age or older. The average household size was 2.17 and the average family size was 2.81.

Age distribution was 22.1% under the age of 18, 6.7% from 18 to 24, 25.8% from 25 to 44, 22.0% from 45 to 64, and 23.3% who were 65 years of age or older. The median age was 42 years. For every 100 females, there were 88.0 males. For every 100 females age 18 and over, there were 77.8 males.

The median household income was $20,273, and the median family income was $28,320. Males had a median income of $23,462 versus $16,375 for females. The per capita income for the town was $11,350. About 17.6% of families and 21.8% of the population were below the poverty line, including 31.4% of those under age 18 and 22.9% of those age 65 or over.

Transportation

Notable people

 Dave Bristol, Major League Baseball manager
 Charles Frazier, National Book Award-winning author, grew up in Andrews
 Tina Gordon, NASCAR driver

References

External links

 
 

1837 establishments in North Carolina
Populated places established in 1837
Populated places on the Valley River
Towns in Cherokee County, North Carolina
Towns in North Carolina